Pitcairnia valerioi is a plant species in the genus Pitcairnia. This species is native to Costa Rica.

References

valerioi
Flora of Costa Rica